Ignardus Badenhorst (born 26 August 1990) is a South African water polo player. He competed in the 2020 Summer Olympics.

References

1990 births
Living people
Sportspeople from Pretoria
Water polo players at the 2020 Summer Olympics
South African male water polo players
Olympic water polo players of South Africa